Booneville/Baldwyn Airport  is a public use airport in Prentiss County, Mississippi, United States. It is owned by the cities of Booneville and Baldwyn, and located six nautical miles (6.9 mi, 11.1 km) southwest of the central business district of Booneville. This airport is included in the FAA's National Plan of Integrated Airport Systems for 2011–2015, which categorized it as a general aviation facility.

Facilities and aircraft 
It has one runway designated 15/33 with an asphalt surface measuring 5,000 by 75 feet (1,524 x 23 m).

For the 12-month period ending October 5, 2010, the airport had 11,500 aircraft operations, an average of 31 per day: 90% general aviation and 10% military. At that time there were 9 aircraft based at this airport: 89% single-engine and 11% multi-engine.

References

External links 
 Aerial image as of February 1996 from USGS The National Map
 
 

Airports in Mississippi
Buildings and structures in Prentiss County, Mississippi
Transportation in Prentiss County, Mississippi